Dylan Edward Cease (born December 28, 1995) is an American professional baseball pitcher for the Chicago White Sox of Major League Baseball (MLB). The Chicago Cubs selected him in the sixth round of the 2014 MLB draft. He made his MLB debut in 2019.

Early life
Cease was born in Milton, Georgia. His mother is Anne Cease, and his father, Jeff Cease, played high school football. His father's side of his family is Jewish. His paternal grandmother, Betty Cease, played professional baseball, and she and her husband Harold Cease are buried in Lakeside Memorial Park, a Jewish cemetery in Doral, Florida.

Amateur career
Cease attended Milton High School ('14) in Milton. In games in which he did not pitch, Cease played shortstop. In 2013, his junior year, he was 9–0 with an 0.81 ERA in 69.1 innings with 100 strikeouts, and Milton won the state championship in baseball. Cease also appeared in a second straight state championship series, but lost to Lambert High School. During the summer seasons, Cease competed for Team Elite out of Winder, Georgia, and excelled, earning him an invitation to the Perfect Game National Showcase and Perfect Game All-American Classic. Cease committed to attend Vanderbilt University on a college baseball scholarship to play for the Vanderbilt Commodores. 

In August 2013, prior to Cease's senior year at Milton, Jonathan Mayo of MLB.com considered Cease to be a potential first-round draft choice in the upcoming 2014 MLB draft. Cease left a game during his senior season, on March 3, 2014, due to elbow soreness, which was later diagnosed as a partial tear of the ulnar collateral ligament (UCL) of the elbow in his pitching arm.

Professional career

Chicago Cubs
As a result of his injury, Cease fell in the draft, and the Chicago Cubs selected him in the sixth round of the 2014 draft. He signed with the Cubs, receiving a $1.5 million signing bonus, well above the $269,500 recommended at that slot. After he signed, he underwent Tommy John surgery to repair the UCL. 

He resumed throwing in May 2015, and pitched for the Arizona Cubs of the Rookie-level Arizona League.  In  11 games (eight starts) batters hit .145 against him. At the end of the 2015 season, Baseball America rated Cease as the second-best prospect in the Arizona League. 

He spent the 2016 season with the Eugene Emeralds of the Class A-Short Season Northwest League, where he posted a 2–0 win–loss record with a 2.22 earned run average and 66 strikeouts in  innings pitched (averaging 13.3 strikeouts per 9 innings). He held batters to a .175 average.  He was named a 2016 Northwest League Post-Season All-Star, and a Baseball America Short-Season All Star.

Cease began the 2017 season with the South Bend Cubs of the Class A Midwest League. Cease had a 1–2 record with a 2.79 ERA in 13 starts for South Bend. He was named a Midwest League Mid-Season All-Star.

Chicago White Sox

2017-19
On July 13, 2017, the Cubs traded Cease, Eloy Jiménez, Matt Rose, and Bryant Flete to the Chicago White Sox for José Quintana. The White Sox assigned him to the Kannapolis Intimidators of the Class A South Atlantic League. In 22 starts between South Bend and Kannapolis, Cease posted a 1–10 record with a 3.28 ERA along with 126 strikeouts in a career-high  innings pitched, averaged 12.2 strikeouts per 9 innings, and held batters to a .221 average.

Cease began the 2018 season with the Winston-Salem Dash of the Class A-Advanced Carolina League, with whom he was 9-2 (his 9 wins were third in the league) with a 2.89 ERA. He earned a midseason promotion to the Birmingham Barons of the Class AA Southern League. Combined he was 12–2 with a 2.40 ERA in 124 innings covering 23 starts, with 160 strikeouts (11.2 strikeouts per 9 innings) and a .189 batting average against. Cease was selected to represent the White Sox at the 2018 All-Star Futures Game. He was named MLB Pipeline Pitcher of the Year, and a Carolina League midseason All-Star. The White Sox added Cease to their 40-man roster after the 2018 season.

Cease opened the 2019 season with the Charlotte Knights of the Class AAA International League. On July 3, the White Sox promoted him to the major leagues. In his debut he pitched five innings, allowed three runs, struck out six batters, and earned the win. He finished the season with a 4–7 record and a 5.79 ERA in 73 innings. His average of 9.99 strikeouts per 9 innings was the highest in White Sox history by a rookie (minimum 10 starts), and his fastball averaged 96.6 mph and reached 100.1 mph.

2020-21
In 2020 he was 5–4 with a 4.01 ERA. Cease led the AL in walks (with 34), and was second in starts (with 12), and fourth in hit batters (with five), as on defense he was fifth in putouts (with six). He led the AL in walks per 9 innings (5.25) and home runs per 9 innings (1.85). He was in the top 3% in average fastball velocity in the major leagues, at 97.5 mph.

On May 4, 2021, Cease hit his first career major league hit during a game against the Cincinnati Reds. Cease went 3-for-3 at the plate and pitched six scoreless innings giving up one hit and striking out 11 as the White Sox won 9–0. 

In 2021, Cease made 32 starts with a record of 13-7 (his 13 wins were 5th-most in the AL, and his .650 win-loss percentage was 8th) and an ERA of 3.91 (9th) and pitched 165.2 innings while striking out 226 batters (3rd; 9th-most in White Sox history) and walking 68 batters (2nd), and led the American League in K/9 with 12.3, starts (32), and wild pitches (13) while giving up 7.55 hits per 9 innings (6th). Cease made his first career postseason start in Game 3 of the 2021 ALDS against the Houston Astros. Cease struggled only pitching 1.2 innings and giving up three runs while striking out two batters in the White Sox' 12–6 win.

2022
In 2022, Cease was named the June AL Pitcher of the Month, his first such monthly honor. Cease was also named the July AL Pitcher of the Month, becoming the first pitcher in White Sox history to win two such awards in consecutive months. On September 3, Cease carried a no-hitter through  innings against the Minnesota Twins before second baseman Luis Arráez hit a line drive single into right-center field. Cease finished the complete game shutout after this (the first complete game of his career), allowing one hit and two walks with seven strikeouts. 

In 2022 he was 14-8 (his 14 wins were 7th in the AL, and his .636 win-loss percentage was 9th) with a 2.20 ERA (2nd in the AL) in 32 starts (3rd) covering 184 innings (10th) with 227 strikeouts (2nd). He was third in the AL with 12.28 strikeouts per 9 innings, allowed 6.16 hits per 9 innings (2nd), led the majors with 78 walks allowed, his 10.4% walk percentage was the highest in the majors, had a WHIP of 1.109 (8th), threw sliders 42.9% of the time (more than any other pitcher in the major leagues), and at 77.8 mph threw the slowest changeup in the major leagues. He primarily threw an 87 mph slider and a 97 mph fourseam fastball, while also throwing an 81 mph curveball. Cease was second in the voting for the Cy Young Award behind Justin Verlander of the Houston Astros, and was named to the All-MLB Second Team.

2023
On January 13, 2023, Cease agreed to a one-year, $5.7 million contract with the White Sox, avoiding salary arbitration. Cease was on the preliminary rosters for both Team Israel and Team USA for the 2023 World Baseball Classic, but decided not to pitch in the WBC.

Personal life
Cease has a twin brother, Alec, who also played on the Milton High School team as a catcher and third baseman.

References

External links

1995 births
Living people
American people of Jewish descent
Twin sportspeople
Sportspeople from Fulton County, Georgia
Baseball players from Georgia (U.S. state)
Major League Baseball pitchers
Chicago White Sox players
Arizona League Cubs players
Eugene Emeralds players
South Bend Cubs players
Kannapolis Intimidators players
Winston-Salem Dash players
Birmingham Barons players
Charlotte Knights players